Hilde Kaufmann (born 28 October 1920 in Werne; died 11 January 1981 in Cologne) was a German jurist and criminologist. From 1966 to 1970, she was a professor at the University of Kiel, then from 1970 until her death a professor and director of the Criminological Research Center at the University of Cologne. Her main scientific subject was the orientation of criminology to the needs of criminal science and criminal justice.

References

German criminologists
1920 births
1981 deaths
German women lawyers
20th-century German lawyers
German women criminologists
20th-century women lawyers
20th-century German women